Michael Venus may refer to:

 Michael Venus (entertainer) (born 1973), Canadian artist, actor and producer
 Michael Venus (tennis) (born 1987), New Zealand tennis player